Floris Takens (12 November 1940 – 20 June 2010) was a Dutch mathematician known for contributions to the theory of chaotic dynamical systems.

Together with David Ruelle, he predicted that fluid turbulence could develop through a strange attractor, a term they coined, as opposed to the then-prevailing theory of accretion of modes. The prediction was later confirmed by experiment. Takens also established the result now known as the Takens's theorem, which shows how to reconstruct a dynamical system from an observed time-series. He was the first to show how chaotic attractors could be learned by neural networks.

Takens was born in Zaandam in the Netherlands. He attended schools in The Hague and in Zaandam before serving in the Dutch army for one year (1960–1961). At the University of Amsterdam he concluded his undergraduate and graduate studies. He was granted a doctorate in mathematics in 1969 under the supervision of Nicolaas Kuiper for a thesis entitled The minimal number of critical points of a function on a compact manifold and the Lusternik–Schnirelmann category.

After his graduate work, Takens spent a year at the Institut des Hautes Études Scientifiques, in Bures-sur-Yvette, near Paris, where he worked with David Ruelle, René Thom, and Jacob Palis. His friendship with Palis has taken him many times to the Instituto de Matemática Pura e Aplicada (IMPA) in Rio de Janeiro, Brazil. Their collaboration produced several joint publications.

Takens was a professor at the University of Groningen, in Groningen, the Netherlands from 1972 until he retired from teaching in 1999.

Takens was member of:
 The Royal Netherlands Academy of Arts and Sciences (since 1991)
 The Brazilian Academy of Sciences (since 1981), and
 The editorial board for the Springer-Verlag's Lecture Notes in Mathematics.

Selected publications

See also
 Bogdanov–Takens bifurcation

Notes

References

Floris Takens - Academia Brasileira de Ciências. Accessed on 26 January 2010.

External links
 

1940 births
2010 deaths
Chaos theorists
Dutch systems scientists
Members of the Brazilian Academy of Sciences
Members of the Royal Netherlands Academy of Arts and Sciences
People from Zaanstad
University of Groningen alumni
Dynamical systems theorists
20th-century Dutch mathematicians
21st-century Dutch  mathematicians